YugabyteDB is a high-performance transactional distributed SQL database for cloud-native applications, developed by Yugabyte.

History
Yugabyte was founded by ex-Facebook engineers Kannan Muthukkaruppan, Karthik Ranganathan, and Mikhail Bautin. At Facebook, they were part of the team that built and operated Cassandra and HBase during a period of significant growth in workloads such as Facebook Messenger and Facebook's Operational Data Store.

The founders came together in February 2016 to build YugabyteDB, believing that the trends they experienced at Facebook – microservices, containerization, high availability, geographic distribution, APIs, and open-source – were relevant to all businesses, especially as they move from on-premise to cloud-native operations.

YugabyteDB was initially available in two editions: community and enterprise. In July 2019, Yugabyte open sourced previously commercial features and launched YugabyteDB as open-source under the Apache 2.0 license.

The rapid evolution of the product led to being named as a 2020 Gartner Cool Vendor in Data Management.

Yugabyte launched Yugabyte Cloud, now renamed YugabyteDB Managed, a fully managed database-as-a-service offering of YugabyteDB, in September 2021.

Funding 

Six years after the company's inception, Yugabyte closed a $188 Million Series C funding round to become a Unicorn start-up with a valuation of $1.3Bn

Architecture 

YugabyteDB is a distributed SQL database that aims to be strongly transactionally consistent across failure zones (i.e. ACID compliance]. Jepsen testing, the de facto industry standard for verifying correctness, has never fully passed, mainly due to race conditions during schema changes. In CAP Theorem terms YugabyteDB is a Consistent/Partition Tolerant (CP) database.

YugabyteDB has two layers, a storage engine known as DocDB and the Yugabyte Query Layer.

DocDB 

The storage engine consists of a customized RocksDB combined with sharding and load balancing algorithms for the data. In addition, the Raft consensus algorithm controls the replication of data between the nodes. There is also a Distributed transaction manager and  Multiversion concurrency control (MVCC) to support distributed transactions.

The engine also exploits a Hybrid Logical Clock that combines coarsely-synchronized physical clocks with Lamport clocks to track causal relationships.

The DocDB layer is not directly accessible by users.

YugabyteDB Query Layer 

Yugabyte has a pluggable query layer that abstracts the query layer from the storage layer below. There are currently two APIs that can access the database:

YSQL is a PostgreSQL code-compatible API based around v11.2. YSQL is accessed via standard PostgreSQL drivers using native protocols. It exploits the native PostgreSQL code for the query layer and replaces the storage engine with calls to the pluggable query layer. This re-use means that Yugabyte supports many features, including:
 Triggers & Stored Procedures
 PostgreSQL extensions that operate in the query layer
 Native JSONB support

YCQL is a Cassandra-like API based around v3.10 and re-written in C++. YCQL is accessed via standard Cassandra drivers using the native protocol port of 9042. In addition to the 'vanilla' Cassandra components, YCQL is augmented with the following features:
 Transactional consistency - unlike Cassandra, Yugabyte YCQL is transactional.
 JSON data types supported natively
 Tables can have secondary indexes

Currently, data written to either API is not accessible via the other API, however YSQL can access YCQL using the PostgreSQL foreign data wrapper feature.

The security model for accessing the system is inherited from the API, so access controls for YSQL look like PostgreSQL, and YCQL looks like Cassandra access controls.

Cluster-to-cluster replication 

In addition to its core functionality of distributing a single database, YugabyteDB has the ability to replicate between database instances. The replication can be one-way or bi-directional and is asynchronous.
One-way replication is used either to create a read-only copy for workload off-loading or in a read-write mode to create an active-passive standby. 
Bi-directional replication is generally used in read-write configurations and is used for active-active configurations, geo-distributed applications, etc.

Migration Tooling 

Yugabyte also provides YugabyteDB Voyager, tooling to facilitate the migration of Oracle and other similar databases to YugabyteDB. This tool supports the migration of schemas, procedural code and data from the source platform to YugabyteDB.

See also

 Cloud database
 Distributed SQL
 Comparison of relational database management systems
 Comparison of object–relational database management systems
 Cloud native computing
 Database management system
 List of databases using MVCC
 List of relational database management systems
 CockroachDB
 TiDB

References

External links
 
 
 Slack community

Database companies
Databases
Bigtable implementations
Database-related software for Linux
NewSQL
Distributed computing
Computer systems
Software companies of the United States
Companies based in Silicon Valley